Thirring may refer to:
Hans Thirring (1888–1976), Austrian physicist (father of Walter Thirring) who introduced the
Lense–Thirring precession, a relativistic correction to the precession of a gyroscope 
Walter Thirring (1927–2014), Austrian physicist (son of Hans Thirring) who introduced the
Thirring model, describing the self-interactions of a Dirac field in two dimension
Thirring–Wess model, describing the interaction of a Dirac field with a vector field in dimension two